Reasor LLC (more simply Reasor's or Reasor's Groceries) is an employee-owned, full-service, regional grocery store chain based in Tahlequah, Oklahoma.  Reasor's has seventeen locations in northeastern Oklahoma.  Reasor's has a significant presence in the Tulsa metro area . One source has stated that the company has 2000 employees , while the Reasor's home page has indicated that the company has "over 2000 employees."

Store departments and services
Reasor's offers services typical of large grocery stores:  meat and deli products, fresh produce, dairy and cheese products, canned goods, etc.  Most locations offer an ATM and Pharmacy. Recently, Reasor's has begun the service of allowing customers to shop for groceries online (begun at its Tahlequah store).

Founding and company history
Reasor's was founded in 1963 with a single store located in Tahlequah by Larry Reasor.  His fundamental business philosophy was to "sell the customers items they want to buy."

Reasor's current CEO is Jeff Reasor (Larry Reasor's son); he has stated that it is his desire to continue operating the company using his father's vision.  He has also stated that "customer service" and "putting customers needs first" continue to be the primary business philosophy of Reasor's.

Acquisition by Brookshire Grocery Company
In November 2021 Brookshire's announced their acquisition of all 17 Reasor's locations, to be finalized in 2022.

See also
 Grocery store
 Chain store

References

External links
 Reasor's homepage
 History and mission statement from Jeff Reasor, CEO
 Reasor's Llc profile at Hoovers.com

Reasors Llc
Reasors Llc
1963 establishments in Oklahoma